2019 NBA season may refer to:

2018–19 NBA season
2019–20 NBA season